The Hampshire Bowl is an annual rugby union knock-out club competition organised by the Hampshire Rugby Football Union.  It was first introduced during the 1999–99 season, with the inaugural winners being Romsey.  It is the second important rugby union cup competition in Hampshire, behind the Hampshire Cup but ahead of the Hampshire Plate.  When it was introduced in 1999 the Bowl initially replaced the Plate competition, which was itself re-instated several years later for the 2003–04 season.

The Hampshire Bowl is currently open to club sides based in Hampshire, the Isle of Wight and the Channel Islands, who play between tier 8 (London 3 South West) and tier 9 (Hampshire Premier) of the English rugby union league system, although sometimes teams from outside the league structure are invited to take part.  The format is a knockout cup with a preliminary round, quarter-finals, semi-finals and a final to be held at the home ground of one of the finalists between March–May.

Hampshire Bowl winners

Number of wins
Eastleigh (3)
Sandown & Shanklin (3)
Petersfield (2)
Trojans (2)
Alton (1)
Andover (1)
Ellingham & Ringwood (1)
Gosport & Fareham (1)
Guernsey (1)
Les Quennevais (1)
Portsmouth (1)
Romsey (1)
Tottonians (1)

See also
 Hampshire RFU
 Hampshire Cup
 Hampshire Plate
 English rugby union system
 Rugby union in England

References

External links
 Hampshire RFU

Recurring sporting events established in 1999
1999 establishments in England
Rugby union cup competitions in England
Rugby union in Hampshire